Clavigo is a 1970s television movie directed by Marcel Ophüls, based on the 1774 play Clavigo by Goethe. The movie is the film version of a play staged and directed by Fritz Kortner. This play premiered 1969 im Deutschen Schauspielhaus, Hamburg, Germany. It was first acclaimed at the Berliner Theatertreffen 1970.

External links
 
 Clavigo on YouTube

1970 films
1970 television films
1970 television plays
German television films
1970s German-language films
German films based on plays
Films based on works by Johann Wolfgang von Goethe
Films set in the 1760s
Films set in Spain
German-language television shows
Television shows based on plays
Filmed stage productions
Das Erste original programming